The United States Judo Federation is a non-profit corporation dedicated to promoting judo in the United States.  Its national office is in Ontario, Oregon.

History
The United States Judo Federation was originally known as the Amateur Judo Association in 1952.  In 1955 it was renamed  Judo Black Belt Federation.  As late as 1955, the JBBF was the only Judo federation in the United States. In 1967, it changed its name to the United States Judo Federation. In 1969, a faction of the Armed Forces Judo Association became the United States Judo Association.

In 2007 sanctioned competitions and tournaments in at least nine different states.

In contrast with USA Judo, Inc. (the USJI), which focuses on elite athletes and American participation in Olympic and international tournaments, USJF's focus is on "grassroots" judo.

Former Leadership
Eichi Karl Koiwai (1968-1976) (died February 23, 2009)Mas Tamura

Kevin Asano

References

External links
United States Judo Federation

Judo organizations
Judo in the United States